Lyndell Elois Vaughn is an American broadcast journalist most notable for her stint as a news anchor and reporter at CNN Headline News in Atlanta from December 1984 to June 1998.  Her unflappable composure and distinct delivery led to mentions in Esquire and Essence magazines, and newspapers all over the country including The New York Times, The Detroit News and The Atlanta Constitution.

Biography
Lyn Vaughn was born into a family of prominent educators in northern Louisiana in 1951.  Skipped to the 3rd grade from the 1st grade after successfully spelling and defining the word "ventriloquist," Vaughn graduated from a boarding school, Holy Rosary Institute, in Lafayette, Louisiana in 1967—Salutatorian at the age of 15.  She was accepted into the University of California, Los Angeles at the age of 16 and graduated with a B.A. in Political Science in June 1971.

Vaughn's first job in broadcasting was as a "desk assistant" or paid intern at WCBS Radio in New York, then an all-news format. She moved to Boston in 1974 with several members of the staff when CBS launched the all-news format at its owned and operated station WEEI. Vaughn moved into television in 1979 at CBS-affiliate WNAC, now WHDH-TV.  To escape the brutal winters, Vaughn relocated to Atlanta and WXIA-TV in 1982 before joining the fledgling CNNHN in December 1984.

Vaughn resigned from CNNHN in June 1998 for a variety of reasons:   1) she says she was unable to secure financial parity with anchors who had been hired many years later than she, 2) says she wanted a break, and 3) wanted to focus more on her personal life.  In 1999, she  joined the staff at WTKR-TV in Norfolk, Virginia anchoring the 5 and 11 PM newscasts.  "Not a small-city girl,"  Vaughn returned to Atlanta in 2001 with then fiance Wesley S. Vann of Portsmouth, Virginia.

Having given hundreds or speeches from Anchorage, Alaska to Honolulu, Hawaii and all through the lower 48 states, Vaughn is still called upon to share her candid remarks about the state of the news business and give motivational talks.  She works primarily in public information, marketing and cable access TV in Atlanta.

References

External links
 Photos of Lyn Vaughn at Headline News
 Video clips of Lyn Vaughn on Headline News

American television news anchors
Living people
Year of birth missing (living people)
University of California, Los Angeles alumni